Sir John Lawrence Knott  (6 July 19101999) was a senior Australian public servant. He was Director-General of the Postmaster-General's Department from 1968 to 1972. Afterwards he was appointed a company director in private industry.

Life and career
Knott was born in Romsey, Victoria on 6 July 1910.

Between August 1957 and April 1958, Knott headed the Department of Defence Production.

He was Secretary of the Department of Supply between 1959 and 1966. During his time in the role, he accompanied Minister for Supply Allen Fairhall overseas visiting the United Kingdom and the United States on departmental business.

In 1966, Knott was appointed Deputy High Commissioner London. At the end of his term in November 1968, when he had been already appointed to head the Postmaster-General's Department starting the following month, Knott attended the UN World Space Conference in Vienna.

Between December 1968 and January 1972, Knott was Director-General of the Postmaster-General's Department.

In 1972, Knott was appointed to the board of Equity Trustees and Agency Co Ltd.

Awards
While Deputy Secretary of the Defence Production Department in January 1957, Knott was made an Officer of the Order of the British Empire. He was promoted to Commander of the Order in December 1960 whilst Secretary of the Department of Supply.

Knott was appointed a Knight Bachelor in June 1971 for his public service. He was made a Companion of the Order of Australia in 1981.

References

1910 births
1999 deaths
Australian public servants
Companions of the Order of Australia
Australian Commanders of the Order of the British Empire
Australian Knights Bachelor